Antonín Procházka may refer to:
 Antonín Procházka (painter) (1882-1945), Czech painter
 Antonín Procházka (volleyball) (born 1942), Czech former volleyball player
 Antonín Procházka (actor) (born 1953), Czech actor, playwright and director